Courtney Rashelle Wetzel (born February 25, 1989) is an American soccer midfielder. She played for the Western New York Flash and Portland Thorns FC of the NWSL, and the Ottawa Fury Women and Seattle Sounders Women in the W-League.

Early life
Wetzel was born in Puyallup, Washington and began playing soccer as a young girl. Starting at age eight, she played for club soccer team, FC Royals, a team she won five state championships with. She attended Puyallup High School where she played on the varsity soccer team for three years. She finished her high school career with 47 goals and 17 assists. As a senior, she was named to the all-state second team after scoring 19 goals.

Wetzel also played for the Washington state and Region IV Olympic Development Program (ODP) teams. She won the 2004 national championship title with the Washington state ODP team and was a finalist in 2005.

Oregon State Beavers
Wetzel attended Oregon State University from 2007 to 2010. She ended her collegiate career with 81 caps for the Beavers and seven goals. She also appeared in two games for the women's basketball team.

Playing career

Club
Wetzel played for the Seattle Sounders Women in 2007 and Ottawa Fury Women in the W-League in 2008 and played for the Fury for four seasons. She was named to the W-League Team of the Week in 2012 after scoring a goal and serving an assist during a shutout win against Hamilton.

On April 5, 2013 she joined the Portland Thorns FC for the 2013 NWSL season as a discovery player. She scored her first goal for the Thorns during a home match on June 7 against FC Kansas City. Wetzel made 18 appearances for the Thorns during the 2013 season and helped the team win the league's championship title.

On April 5, 2014, Wetzel was traded with Kathryn Williamson and Portland's first-round pick in the 2015 NWSL College Draft to the Western New York Flash for Sarah Huffman and a player to be named later. April 7, 2014, Portland Thorns revealed that the player to be named later was Verónica Boquete. The draft pick became Jaelene Hinkle.

She was waived by the Western New York Flash in September 2014.

International
Wezel was called up to the United States women's national under-23 soccer team in 2010.

References

External links
 Portland Thorns player profile
 Oregon State player profile
 Ottawa Fury player profile
 Connect World Football profile
 

1989 births
Living people
American women's soccer players
Seattle Sounders Women players
Portland Thorns FC players
Soccer players from Washington (state)
National Women's Soccer League players
Sportspeople from Puyallup, Washington
Oregon State Beavers women's basketball players
Oregon State Beavers women's soccer players
Women's association football midfielders
Western New York Flash players
Ottawa Fury (women) players
USL W-League (1995–2015) players
American expatriate sportspeople in Canada
Expatriate women's soccer players in Canada